James Libby Tryon (November 21, 1864 - December 21, 1958) was a peace advocate and the director of admissions at the Massachusetts Institute of Technology. He was a member of the Massachusetts Peace Society that merged with other local chapters to become the American Peace Society in 1928.

Biography
James Libby Tryon was born on November 21, 1864, in Boston, Massachusetts to Joseph A. Tryon and Ellen Bigelow Cummings.  He attended Harvard University and graduated with degrees in law and divinity: A.B., Harvard, 1894; B.D., Episcopal Theological School, Massachusetts, 1897; L.L.B., Boston University, 1909, Ph.D., 1910.<ref>Who's who in New England, a Biographical Dictionary of Leading Living Men and Women, 1905 edition</ref> He was a reporter for the Portland Press, 1884; its city editor, 1885, city editor of the Bangor Commercial, 1886; night editor of the Portland Argus'', 1887-8. He was appointed deacon, 1896; priest, 1897, rector of All Saints' Church, Attleboro, Mass., 1897-1907; assistant secretary of the American Peace Society, 1907-11; secretary of the Massachusetts Peace Society, and was appointed director of the New England department of the American Peace Society, June, 1911. He served as a member of the International Peace Congress held in Munich in 1907, in London, 1908, in Geneva, 1912, in The Hague, 1913. He lectured on international arbitration at the Episcopal Theological School in Cambridge, Massachusetts from 1908 to 1911. He undertook a lecture tour of Canadian clubs, universities and churches to promote the peace centennial during the spring of 1911. He also served as a member of the Massachusetts Prison Association, the American Society of International Law, the American Society for the Judicial Settlement of International Disputes, the American Political Science Association and the American Academy of Political and Social Science.

He was the Director of Admissions at the Massachusetts Institute of Technology from 1930 to 1936.

Tryon died on December 21, 1958 in Medford, Massachusetts at Lawrence Memorial Hospital of Medford.

Publications
 The Inter-parliamentary Union and its work (1911)
 A World Treaty of Arbitration (1911)
 A permanent court of international justice; a suggestion for the programme committee of the third Hague conference (1913) 
 The century of the Anglo-American peace (1914)

References

External links
Sylvia Tryon's biography of Kate Allen Tryon and Dr. James Libby Tryon 
James Libby Tryon at Google Books

1864 births
1958 deaths
American anti-war activists
Nonviolence advocates
Harvard University alumni
Boston University School of Law alumni